Sergei Pareiko (born 31 January 1977) is a retired Estonian footballer.  He is currently the sporting director of Estonian football club Levadia. Pareiko played as a goalkeeper in Estonian, Russian and Polish top tiers. He made a total of 65 appearances for the Estonia national football team.

Club career
In Estonia, Pareiko played for Tallinna Sadam and Levadia Maardu, before moving to Russia in 2001, when he signed with Rotor Volgograd. After Rotor were relegated, Pareiko moved to Tom Tomsk.

At the end of 2009 season Pareiko was named the Tom Tomsk Player of Year, sharing this title with Đorđe Jokić. In late 2010, speculation began to mount that Celtic were interested in Pareiko's services. Pareiko was left on the bench for Tomsk's last match of the season. He left the club on 25 December.

On 8 February 2011 Pareiko joined Polish Ekstraklasa side Wisła Kraków on a one and a half-year deal. He became the first choice goalkeeper and won the Ekstraklasa championship in his debut season. Pareiko finished third in voting for the Estonian Footballer of the Year in 2011.

International career
Pareiko made his international debut for the Estonia national team on 31 August 1996, in a 1998 World Cup qualifier against Belarus when the first choice keeper, Mart Poom, got injured in the 8th minute of the match. The match ended with 0–1 loss.

His second cap came 6 years later and he became the team's first choice keeper in 2009. On 17 November 2015, Pareiko made his last appearance for Estonia against Saint Kitts and Nevis. The game ended 3-0 for Estonia. Pareiko's national team career lasted 19 years, 2 months and 17 days, making him the longest serving Estonia national team member ahead of Andres Oper.

Personal life
Pareiko was born in Tallinn, to a Russian mother and Belarusian father. In the interview for Gazeta Krakowska he said "I am a citizen of Estonia, I have a passport of that country, but I am of Russian nationality".
He married Victoria, in 2003, and they have one son named, Daniil.

Honours

Tallinna Sadam
Estonian Cup: 1995–96, 1996–97
Estonian SuperCup: 1997

Casale Calcio
Coppa Italia Dilettanti: 1998–99

Levadia Maardu
Meistriliiga: 1999, 2000
Estonian Cup: 1999–00
Estonian SuperCup: 1999, 2000

Wisła Kraków
Ekstraklasa: 2010–11

Individual
 Tom Tomsk Player of the Year: 2009

Statistics

Club career
This statistic includes domestic league only

Last update: 17 November 2015

International statistics

References

External links

 
Sergei Pareiko Interview Soccernet 

1977 births
Living people
Footballers from Tallinn
Estonian people of Belarusian descent
Estonian people of Russian descent
Estonian footballers
Association football goalkeepers
Estonia international footballers
FCI Levadia Tallinn players
FC Rotor Volgograd players
Estonian expatriate footballers
Casale F.B.C. players
Expatriate footballers in Italy
Estonian expatriate sportspeople in Italy
FC Tom Tomsk players
Expatriate footballers in Russia
Estonian expatriate sportspeople in Russia
Russian Premier League players
Wisła Kraków players
Ekstraklasa players
Expatriate footballers in Poland
Estonian expatriate sportspeople in Poland
FC Volga Nizhny Novgorod players
FC Puuma Tallinn players
Meistriliiga players